The consensus 1931 College Basketball All-American team, as determined by aggregating the results of two major All-American teams.  To earn "consensus" status, a player must win honors from a majority of the following teams: the Helms Athletic Foundation and College Humor Magazine.

1931 Consensus All-America team

Individual All-America teams

See also
 1930–31 NCAA men's basketball season

References

NCAA Men's Basketball All-Americans
All-Americans